Canadian Pacific 1246 is a preserved G5c class 4-6-2 "Pacific" type steam locomotive built by the Montreal Locomotive Works in 1946. In 1965, it became one of three G5 locomotives to be purchased by Steamtown, U.S.A. for excursion service. After operating in Scranton for a few years in the 1980s, No. 1246 was sold at an October 1988 auction to the Railroad Museum of New England with plans to restore and operate it, and it was initially put on static display. As of 2022, No. 1246 is stored at the Railroad Museum of New England.

History

Revenue service 
No. 1246 was built by the Montreal Locomotive Works in Montreal, Quebec in 1946. It rolled out of the Shops on June 29, 1946 as the fourteenth member of the Canadian Pacific Railway's (CPR) G5c class. It was initially assigned by the CPR to operate in Alberta and Saskatchewan in Western Canada, and it travelled for 655,773 miles during its revenue career between July 1946 and March 1958. Despite having a 4-6-2 wheel arrangement, No. 1246 was primarily used for freight service, and records only show the locomotive hauling passengers for a combined total of thirteen months. The G5c was overhauled for the sixth and final time by the CPR at Winnipeg, coming out of Weston Shops on June 15, 1958. However, the locomotive never operated for the CPR again after the overhaul.

Steamtown ownership 
After sitting idle for seven years, No. 1246 became one of three G5 class locomotives to be purchased in May 1965 for $8,200 by F. Nelson Blount for his Steamtown, U.S.A. collection. The other two G5s in the Steamtown collection were G-5ds No. 1278 and No. 1293. No. 1246 was towed from one of the CPR's scrap lines to North Walpole, New Hampshire for static display in Steamtown. In 1966, the locomotive was moved along with the rest of the collection to Bellows Falls, Vermont in order for the locomotives to be more spread out while on display. In June 1967, Canadian Pacific 1246 was transferred to the Green Mountain Railroad (GMRR) with the intention of restoring it to operate on their trackage. The locomotive was restored in 1969, and it was modified with a visor headlight and a mounted bell above the smokebox, and it was given a nameplate with the lettering “F. Nelson Blount” to pay tribute to Blount's passing two years prior. No. 1246 was used by the GMRR to pull multiple excursion trains between Bellows Falls and Chester alongside No. 1293, as well as Canadian National 2-6-0 No. 89 and Rahway Valley 2-8-0 No. 15.

When Steamtown and the GMRR went their separate ways, ownership of the locomotive was transferred back to Steamtown in August 1973, and its nameplate was removed. It subsequently accompanied No. 1278 to pull trains over the Vermont Railway between Bennington and Burlington. In December 1973, No. 1246 assisted No. 1278, which masqueraded as Delaware and Hudson (D&H) 653 at the time, with an excursion to Rutland, and to pay tribute to a scrapped Rutland 4-6-2, No. 1246 was briefly renumbered to 82. In the late 1970s, No. 1246 was painted in CPR gray-blue and Tuscan red, a livery it never wore in revenue service. However, after falling victim to a roundhouse collapse in 1982, the locomotive was repaired with new flues, and it was painted black again with its visor headlight and mounted bell removed. In the fall of 1983, No. 1246 led the "farewell to Vermont" excursions alongside Nos 1293 and G3c No. 2317. There were two  excursions "through a landscape of covered bridges, rushing streams and scenic countryside". The final train held a capacity of 800–1,000 passengers.

Upon arrival in Scranton, Pennsylvania, No. 1246 began pulling excursion trains over the ex-Delaware, Lackawanna and Western (DLW) line between Scranton and Moscow. In March 1986, however, it was decided that No. 1246 was inadequate for service as it was deemed too light for the heavy grades and sharp curves of Steamtown's new trackage, and the locomotive's flue time was close to expiring. When the National Park Service (NPS) purchased Steamtown, they reopened it as Steamtown National Historic Site, and No. 1246 was among five steam locomotives the NPS deemed inadequate for the collection. The locomotive was sold at Steamtown's final auction on October 29, 1988.

Disposition 
The new owner of No, 1246 was the Railroad Museum of New England (RMNE), who moved it to their leased location in Essex, Connecticut in April 1989. The RMNE purchased No. 1246 with the hopes of bringing it back to steam to operate at a new site.  RMNE cosmetically restored it in 1996 for static display in Old Saybrook. In 2008, the museum moved No. 1246 along with other rolling stock in their collection to Thomaston, Connecticut, a town where the Naugatuck Railroad currently operates. As of 2022, No. 1246 remains in outdoor storage in Thomaston. Long-term plans are for an operational restoration.

Surviving sister engines 

 No. 1201 is currently on static display inside the Canada Science and Technology Museum in Ottawa, Ontario in Canada.
 No. 1238 is currently in storage under private ownership at the Prairie Dog Central Railway in Winnipeg, Manitoba in Canada.
 No. 1278 is currently on static display at the Age of Steam Roundhouse in Sugarcreek, Ohio in the United States.
 No. 1286 is currently in storage under private ownership at the Prairie Dog Central Railway in Winnipeg, Manitoba in Canada.
 No. 1293 is currently on display at the Age of Steam Roundhouse in Sugarcreek, Ohio in the United States, waiting for a rebuild.

References

MLW locomotives
4-6-2 locomotives
1246
Steam locomotives of the United States
Individual locomotives of Canada
Preserved steam locomotives of Canada
Railway locomotives introduced in 1946
Standard gauge locomotives of the United States
Standard gauge locomotives of Canada
Preserved steam locomotives of Connecticut